is a professional Japanese baseball player. He plays outfielder for the Hokkaido Nippon-Ham Fighters. He was born to a Japanese mother and a father from the Democratic Republic of the Congo.

References 

2000 births
Living people
Baseball people from Tokyo
Japanese baseball players
Japanese people of Democratic Republic of the Congo descent
Nippon Professional Baseball outfielders
Hokkaido Nippon-Ham Fighters players